The Metropolitan Museum of Art has a pair of 17th-century Japanese lacquered wood incense boxes in the shape of mandarin ducks in its collection.

Description 
The pair of boxes (Kōgō) were used to hold sticks of incense, used in Zen Buddhist ceremonies. The two boxes are shaped like mandarin ducks (Aix galericulata), which were considered symbols of marital bliss and fidelity. Both the ducks and their stand are made from wood covered in gold lacquer. The top of the stand is decorated with groups of pond plants.

The ducks were donated to the Metropolitan Museum of Art as part of the bequest of Benjamin Altman in 1913.

Gallery

References

Sculptures of the Metropolitan Museum of Art
Japanese sculpture
Japanese lacquerware
Buddhist sculpture